The 1984 European Grand Prix was a Formula One motor race held at Nürburgring on 7 October 1984. It was the fifteenth race of the 1984 Formula One World Championship. It was also the first Formula One race to be held at the Nürburgring since 1976, and the first to be run on the new  GP-Strecke circuit, rather than the historic  Nordschleife, which after new pit facilities and layout modifications had been shortened so that both circuits could be used at the same time.

The 67-lap race was won by Frenchman Alain Prost, driving a McLaren-TAG. Italian Michele Alboreto finished second in a Ferrari, with Brazilian Nelson Piquet third in a Brabham-BMW, having started from pole position.

Prost's Austrian teammate Niki Lauda, who nearly lost his life in the last F1 race at the Nürburgring in 1976, finished fourth. With the reallocation of the disqualified Tyrrell team's points two days after the race and Prost thus gaining an extra point, Lauda's lead in the Drivers' Championship was reduced to 3.5 points with one race remaining.

Report
During the race morning warm-up session, Alain Prost spun his McLaren-TAG and hit a course car parked at the side of the circuit.

Young Brazilian driver Ayrton Senna triggered a first corner accident which took out the cars of Keke Rosberg, Marc Surer, Gerhard Berger, and Piercarlo Ghinzani. Senna's Toleman (which had started 12th) had run into the back of Rosberg's Williams under braking at the end of the main straight which caused the accident. Rosberg had started fourth (after blowing his Honda engine coming out of the final corner of his qualifying lap), but was slow off the line as his engine had suddenly developed a misfire.

After qualifying second on the grid, Alain Prost won the race in his McLaren from the Ferrari of Michele Alboreto and the Brabham-BMW of defending World Champion Nelson Piquet, with both the Ferrari and Brabham running out of fuel as they crossed the finish line. When they got out of their cars which stopped at the pit exit, Alboreto and Piquet raised their arms to each other in a gesture of frustration at FISA's 220 litre fuel limit for turbos which had reduced races to economy runs.

Niki Lauda, who had almost lost his life in a fiery crash during the 1976 German GP, started 15th and finished 4th in his McLaren. In stark contrast to the lack of safety of the Nordschleife, Lauda gave the new GP-Strecke the thumbs up as a very safe Grand Prix circuit, saying that it was "the perfect place to hold a Grand Prix".

Classification

Qualifying

Race

Championship standings after the race

Drivers' Championship standings

Constructors' Championship standings

References

European Grand Prix
European Grand Prix
European Grand Prix
European Grand Prix